This article describes the group stage of the 2019–20 EHF Cup, a men's handball competition.

Draw
The 16 teams allocated into four pots will be drawn into four groups of four teams. The draw seeding pots were composed as follows:

The draw of the EHF Cup group stage took place on Thursday, 28 November 2019.

Format
In each group, teams will play against each other in a double round-robin format, with home and away matches. After completion of the group stage matches, the top teams and the best three second-placed teams advance to the Quarter-finals. Teams are not able to face opponents from the same country in the group.

Tiebreakers
In the group stage, teams will be ranked according to points (2 points for a win, 1 point for a draw, 0 points for a loss). After completion of the group stage, if two or more teams had scored the same number of points, the ranking will be determined as follows:

Highest number of points in matches between the teams directly involved;
Superior goal difference in matches between the teams directly involved;
Highest number of goals scored in matches between the teams directly involved (or in the away match in case of a two-team tie);
Superior goal difference in all matches of the group;
Highest number of plus goals in all matches of the group;
If the ranking of one of these teams is determined, the above criteria are consecutively followed until the ranking of all teams is determined. If no ranking can be determined, a decision shall be obtained by EHF through drawing of lots.

Groups
The matchdays will be 8–9 February, 15–16 February, 22–23 February, 29 February–1 March 2020, 21–22 March and 28–29 March 2020.

The European Handball Federation announced on 13 March 2020, that the EHF Cup group stage matches round 5 and 6 (21 to 22 and 28 to 29 March) matches will not be held as scheduled due to the ongoing developments in the spread of COVID-19 across Europe. On 25 March, the EHF announced that no matches will be played before June due to the coronavirus pandemic. On 24 April 2020 the matches were cancelled.

Group A

Group B

Group C

Group D

References

External links
EHF Cup (official website)

group stage